United Autosports is a sports car racing team, founded by American businessman and entrepreneur Zak Brown and Richard Dean (racing driver).

In 2020, United Autosports became the first ever team to win the prestigious 24 Hours of Le Mans (LMP2 Class) and two other high profile endurance sports car championships in the same year - the FIA World Endurance Championship (LMP2) and the European Le Mans Series.

In 2023, the team is contesting the FIA World Endurance Championship, European Le Mans Series and Michelin Le Mans Cup.

United Autosports also prepares and races a range of historic race cars in events across the world, such as the Rolex Monterey Motorsports Reunion and the Le Mans and Silverstone Classics.

Since the team's founding in 2009, United Autosports has competed in high-profile races across the world, including the Spa 24 Hours, the Bathurst 12 Hour, the Gulf 12 Hours, and the Dubai 24 Hour, along with entering championships such as the British Touring Car Championship, GT Cup, European Supercar Challenge, Ginetta GT4 Supercup, FIA GT3 European Championship, and Blancpain Endurance Series and the British GT Championship. The team has also raced in the Rolex 24 Hours of Daytona, Intercontinental Le Mans Cup, Macau GT Cup, and Petit Le Mans.

United Autosports has partnerships with two world-renowned motor racing teams, Walkinshaw Andretti United in Australia and US-based Andretti Autosport. Andretti and United also co-operate a team in the Extreme E off-road racing series.

United Autosports has frequently signed accomplished guest drivers to compete in the team's racecars at key events, including Fernando Alonso, Mark Blundell, David Brabham, Martin Brundle, Eddie Cheever, Paul di Resta, Johnny Herbert, Stefan Johansson, Arie Luyendyk, Juan Pablo Montoya, Bruno Senna and Markus Winkelhock. The squad's driver line-ups have also featured some of the top up-and-coming professional racing drivers, such as Brendon Hartley, Alex Lynn and Lando Norris.

History

2022 
United Autosports opened the year at the 24 Hours of Daytona, before scoring two wins in the two Asian Le Mans Series Abu Dhabi races courtesy of Scotsman Paul Di Resta and team newcomer Josh Pierson – the American teenager unable to enter the first two races until he became 16-years-old due to regulations.

The team’s two-car entry in the FIA World Endurance Championship achieved 10 top-six finishes throughout the season, which included first place in the opening Sebring race. Josh Pierson became the youngest driver to race and to finish a WEC race, going onto take another world record at the 24 Hours of Le Mans later that year as the youngest ever contender.

In November, the Wakefield-based went to the finale of the FIA World Endurance Championship race with a chance of winning the LMP2 Teams’ title for a second time - but ultimately had to be content with third (Josh Pierson, Alex Lynn and Oliver Jarvis) and seventh (Filipe Albuquerque, Phil Hanson, Will Owen) in the title race.

United Autosports also claimed third place (Phil Hanson, Tom Gamble, Duncan Tappy) in the European Le Mans Series LMP2 Teams Championship after registering four top-four results, including a victory and runners-up placing. Its two car LMP3 entry finished fifth (Andrew Bentley, Kay van Berlo, James McGuire) and seventh (Josh Caygill, Finn Gehrsitz, Bailey Voisin) in the Teams’ class standings, their Ligiers having chalked up eight top-10s (a win plus two other podiums).  

The Anglo-American team’s highlight in the Michelin Le Mans Cup was a second and third at Imola.

2021 
In 2021, United Autosports contested more races than ever before - 43 over 41 race weekends - resulting in the most top-three podium race finishes the team had ever achieved in a single year, totalling 36 including 12 victories.

The team competed in the GT4 Euro Series for the first time, winning the Silver Teams’ title. Bailey Voisin and Charlie Fagg claimed the Silver Driver’s Award with Gus Bowers and Dean Macdonald taking fifth place.

In the European Le Mans Series LMP2 category, Phil Hanson, Tom Gamble and Jonathan Aberdein were victorious in the final race of the season at Portimão, earning second-place in the final Driver’s standings. United finished runners-up (car #22) and ninth (car #32) in the Teams’ Trophy. In the European Le Mans SeriesLMP3 category, Edouard Cauhaupe, Wayne Boyd and Rob Wheldon finished third overall.

In the FIA World Endurance Championship, Phil Hanson took fourth in the Endurance Trophy for LMP2 Drivers. United Autosports also came fourth in the Endurance Trophy for LMP2 Teams.

Extreme E was another new programme in 2021, which the team entered in partnership with Andretti as Andretti United Extreme E. Catie Munnings and Timmy Hansen were the driver duo in the inaugural year of this radical, eco-conscious championship. They won the 2021 Arctic X-Prix, finished fourth in the Teams’ Championship standings overall, while Munnings and Hansen claimed third in the Driver’s Championship.

2020
Victory at CoTA in February earned United an early lead in the WEC LMP2 Championship but racing was then suspended due to the Coronavirus pandemic (COVID-19 pandemic), the series resuming only in August at Spa, where Hanson, Albuquerque and di Resta emerged victorious once again. The trio followed this with a class victory in the delayed Le Mans 24 Hours in September to clinch the LMP2 Championship with a race to spare. United Autosports began its quest for ELMS title success by winning the LMP2 and LMP3 categories in the opening two races at Paul Ricard and Spa. A return to Paul Ricard for Round 3, the "Le Castellet 240", at the end of August saw a third consecutive victory in LMP2 for United, extending the team's lead. Phill Hanson and Filipe Albuquerque won the European Le Mans Series Championship at Monza clinching the title after winning the race. They became the first drivers to win the WEC, Le Mans 24H and ELMS championships in a single season  and United became the first team to win the FIA World Endurance Championship (LMP2), European Le Mans Series and the Le Mans 24 Hours (LMP2) all in the same year. United Autosports ultimately also secured the ELMS LMP3 Championship for a third time: Wayne Boyd, Tom Gamble and Rob Wheldon won the final four-hour race at Portimão to clinch United's third Team's title in the past five years. The trio achieved three wins, a third place and four poles. 
 
In July 2020 United announced its entry into the Extreme E series with Andretti Autosport, creating a brand new team – Andretti United Extreme E. The British team will partner with US-based Andretti Autosport for an inaugural season of electric, off-road SUV racing in 2021 with Briton Catie Munnings and Timmy Hansen, from Sweden, racing for the team. United Autosports will enter the GT4 European Series in 2021 with a brace of McLaren 570S GT4 cars.

In September 2020, it was announced that the team purchased all of the defunct Strakka Racing team's assets, which included all of their race team equipment, race cars, trucks and their race team premises close to Silverstone circuit, for an undisclosed sum.

2019
United was placed fourth in both LMP2 and LMP3 in the European Le Mans Series Teams Championship, but 2019 marked an important milestone as the team made its full FIA World Endurance Championship entry, with an Oreca 07, for Phil Hanson, Filipe Albuquerque and Paul Di Resta. Podium finishes in Japan and China then a maiden WEC LMP2 class victory in Bahrain saw United close out the year second in the standings with the series continuing into 2020 with three more races, culminating at Le Mans for the 24 Hours in September.

2018
Through a 25% shareholding in Walkinshaw Andretti United, United Autoports entered the 2018 Supercars Championship. The team is co-owned by Ryan Walkinshaw, son of Tom Walkinshaw of Tom Walkinshaw Racing and Michael Andretti's operation Andretti Autosport.

The team signed Formula 1 legend and two-time world champion Fernando Alonso, 2018 McLaren F1 test and reserve driver Lando Norris and ex-F1 and former DTM champion Paul di Resta for the 2018 Rolex 24 Hours of Daytona. The latter, along with Hugo De Sadeleer, Will Owen and Bruno Senna, finished fourth overall.

Hugo de Sadeleer, Will Owen and Juan Pablo Montoya achieved a third-place finish at Le Mans in their Ligier JS P217 while in the ELMS, United recorded fourth (LMP2) and third (LMP3) in the final Team's standings. The Anglo-American team made its début in the 2018–19 Asian Le Mans Series, winning the title outright with LMP2 runners Phil Hanson and Paul Di Resta and claiming second in LMP3.

2017 

United Autosports made the team's first appearance in LMP2 by entering a Ligier JS P217 in the 2017 European Le Mans Series.  Filipe Albuquerque, Will Owen and Hugo de Sadeleer scored two race wins – three podiums in total - to finish runners-up in the championship standings. In June, the trio also combined to make United Autosport's Le Mans 24 Hours début, finishing fourth in the LMP2 class (fifth overall). The team also returned with their two Ligier JS P3 sports prototypes and successfully defended its LMP3 ELMS title, courtesy of John Falb and Sean Rayhall (USA).

The UK-based team also entered a brace of Ligier LMP3 cars in the Michelin Le Mans Cup, while in support of its Ligier UK business, United Autosports also helped to launch and then raced in the Henderson Insurance LMP3 Cup Championship. American drivers C. J. Wilson and Andrew Evans, along with Tony Wells and United regular, Matt Bell raced the team's Ligier JS P3 sports prototypes.

2016 

United Autosports made the team's début in the European Le Mans Series at Silverstone in April with a pair of Ligier JS P3 sports cars and drivers Alex Brundle, Mike Guasch, Christian England, Mark Patterson, Wayne Boyd and Matt Bell. The team won the first three races and scored eight podiums throughout the year, winning both the team and driver championships with one round remaining. The team also entered the inaugural Road to Le Mans race – one of the support races to the Le Mans 24 Hours – with former F1 driver Martin Brundle pairing up with Christian England. Brundle took pole position. American duo Guy Cosmo and Mike Hedlund were behind the wheel of the second Ligier, with Guy Cosmo scoring the fastest lap of the race and setting the LMP3 lap record round the  Circuit de la Sarthe.

2015 

The team returned to the GT Cup Championship in 2015 with the Audi R8 LMS ultra and driver Phil Burgan. They also put plans in place to move into prototype racing with two LMP3 cars in the European Le Mans Series.

2014 

The new season saw United Autosports branching out into new territory, and contesting the British Touring Car Championship with a pair of Toyota Avensis Touring Cars and drivers James Cole and Glynn Geddie. The team also entered the 2014 Ginetta GT4 Supercup support race with Luke Davenport and Carl Breeze, winning the Team title at the end of the year.

United Autosports contested the GT Cup Championship in 2014 and won the overall and GTO Championship with Jim Geddie in his McLaren MP4-12C GT3. They also continued with their Audi R8 LMS ultra in the British GT Championship.

2013 

In 2013, United Autosports once again entered the British GT Championship with two McLaren MP4-12C GT3 cars and their one remaining Audi R8 LMS ultra. Matt Bell and Mark Patterson came second in the championship after scoring three podiums and a win at the final round at Donington Park. They missed out on the title in their Audi by only half a point. However, this was the season when the team won its first championship title, with Jim and Glynn Geddie in their McLaren MP4-12C GT3 as they stormed to victory in the European Supercar Challenge.

2012 

In January the team made its début in the Dubai 24 Hours (2012 Results) with two Audi R8 LMS cars. The team also became one of the first customers for the McLaren MP4-12C GT3 and raced two examples in the Blancpain Endurance Series for drivers Zak Brown, Mark Blundell, Mark Patterson, Álvaro Parente, Matt Bell and David Brabham. Although still racing the  Audi R8 LMS in the 2012 British GT Championship, they switched to McLarens for the final few rounds of the UK national series. United Autosports gave the McLaren MP4-12C GT3 the model's first win at Snetterton in the British GT Championship with Matt Bell and Charles Bateman behind the wheel. Further British GT Championship wins came for Bell and Bateman at Silverstone and also at Donington Park for Zak Brown and Álvaro Parente.

2011 

The team partnered with Michael Shank Racing for the 2011 Rolex 24 Hours of Daytona, finishing fourth in the Daytona prototype class. The Ford Riley Daytona Prototype was driven by Martin Brundle, Mark Blundell, Mark Patterson and Zak Brown.

United Autosports competed in the 2011 British GT Championship with Matt Bell, John Bintcliffe, Jay Palmer and Mike Guasch.

They also contested the FIA GT3 European Championship with Matt Bell, Zak Brown, Joe Osborne and Mark Patterson. That year they also entered 2011 Petit Le Mans, with drivers Mark Patterson, Stefan Johansson and Zak Brown.

2010 

The team's best results in 2010 were podium finishes in the 2010 FIA GT3 European Championship, 24 Hours of Spa, 2010 1000 km of Zhuhai and the Macau Grand Prix.

Historic racing
Aside from their modern-day racing activities, United Autosports is also involved in historic racing and preparation of historic racing cars. The team's collection of cars spans many decades and race series, and includes the 1991 Senna McLaren MP4/6, 1980 Alan Jones championship-winning Williams FW07 and a 1970 Jackie Stewart March 701. They also maintain and race sports cars such as the 1986 Porsche 962 and the JLP-3 Porsche 935. The team enters many prestigious historic events around the world, including the Rolex Monterey Motorsports Reunion, the Le Mans Classic, and the annual Silverstone Classic weekend, among others.

Racing record

24 Hours of Le Mans results

References

External links 

 

American auto racing teams
Auto racing teams established in 2009
2009 establishments in the United Kingdom
24 Hours of Le Mans teams
Blancpain Endurance Series teams
British Touring Car Championship teams
British GT Championship teams
American Le Mans Series teams
WeatherTech SportsCar Championship teams
European Le Mans Series teams
British auto racing teams
FIA World Endurance Championship teams
Supercars Championship teams